Shibkaveh District is a district (bakhsh) in Fasa County, Fars Province, Iran. At the 2006 census, its population was 28,422 in 6,492 families. The district has one city: Zahedshahr. The district has two rural districts (dehestan): Fedashkuyeh Rural District and Miyan Deh Rural District.

References 

Fasa County
Districts of Fars Province